The 590s decade ran from January 1, 590, to December 31, 599.

Significant people

References